On 17 August 2016, two armed men with axes and firearms attacked the traffic police station on Shchelkovskoye highway near Moscow. Both the attackers were shot dead by police.

Attack
The attack took place on Wednesday afternoon in Balashikha on the Shchelkovskoye highway, 20km (12 miles) east of Moscow. The attack on the police station was carried out by two men armed with guns and axes. They seriously injured the policeman Mikhail Balakin, who was on duty in the street near the post, and opened fire on the police station building from his service weapon. By answering fire, the third inspector of the station, lieutenant Valery Pankov, managed to neutralize the attackers and called for reinforcements.

Victims
Two policemen were injured. One of them, Mikhail Balakin, died in the hospital later two weeks after the attack.

Attackers
According to the Interfax news agency, attackers were natives of Chechnya. They were not previously known to authorities.  Both the attackers were shot dead by police, one died instantly, while the other later succumbed to his injuries. The attackers did not have accomplices.

Reaction
A criminal case was initiated in the Investigative Committee of Russia on the grounds of the crime provided for in Article 317 of the Criminal Code of the Russian Federation (encroachment on the lives of law enforcement officers). The official representative of the Ministry of Internal Affairs stated that the police officers who neutralized attackers will be presented to the state award. 

Islamic State of Iraq and Levant released a statement claiming that the attackers were "fighters from the Islamic State"   and calling it revenge for Russia's aerial bombing campaign in Syria.

See also

 Terrorism in Russia

References

2016 crimes in Russia
2016 murders in Europe
Attacks on police stations in the 2010s
Islamic terrorism in Russia
Islamic terrorist incidents in 2016
Stabbing attacks in 2016
History of Moscow Oblast
August 2016 crimes in Europe
Axe attacks
Terrorist incidents in Russia in 2016